Heneri Amos Murima Dzinotyiweyi is a Zimbabwean mathematician and politician. A former University of Zimbabwe Dean of Science, he is the Movement for Democratic Change-Tsvangirai member of parliament for Budiriro in Harare.

On 10 February 2009, Morgan Tsvangirai designated Dzinotyiweyi for the position of Minister of Science and Technology Development as part of the Zimbabwe Government of National Unity of 2009.

References

Year of birth missing (living people)
Living people
Zimbabwean mathematicians
Academic staff of the University of Zimbabwe
Members of the National Assembly of Zimbabwe
People from Harare
Government ministers of Zimbabwe
Fellows of the African Academy of Sciences